Demetris Economou (born 10 November 1992 in Paralimni, Cyprus) is a Cypriot football defender who currently plays for Achyronas Liopetriou in the Cypriot Third Division.

References

External links
 

1992 births
Living people
Cypriot footballers
Association football defenders
Cyprus youth international footballers
Cyprus under-21 international footballers
Enosis Neon Paralimni FC players
Anorthosis Famagusta F.C. players
Ayia Napa FC players
Cypriot First Division players
Cypriot Second Division players